The American Association for Anatomy (AAA), based in Rockville, MD, was founded in Washington, D.C. in 1888 as the Association of American Anatomists for the "advancement of anatomical science." AAA later changed its name to the American Association of Anatomists, and then became the American Association for Anatomy in 2019. AAA is an international membership organization of biomedical researchers and educators specializing in the structural foundation of health and disease.

In addition to being the primary educators of healthcare profession students in their first year of training, AAA members work in imaging, cell biology, genetics, molecular development, endocrinology, histology, neuroscience, forensics, microscopy, physical anthropology, and numerous other developing areas.

AAA holds an annual meeting (part of Experimental Biology through 2022); offers a wide range or awards, grants, scholarships, and fellowships; provides a variety of professional development programs and resources; and publishes three peer-reviewed journals: Anatomical Sciences Education, Developmental Dynamics and The Anatomical Record: Advances in Integrative Anatomy and Evolutionary Biology.

The rank of Fellow of the American Association of Anatomists (FAAA) honors distinguished members who have contributed to the anatomical sciences.

Past President
 Rick Sumner, Ph.D. (Term ends 2023)

President
 Valerie DeLeon, Ph.D. (Term ends 2023)

President-Elect
 Martine Dunnwald, Ph.D. (Term ends 2023)

References

External links
 
 Experimental Biology
 Past Presidents
 Fellows

Medical associations based in the United States
Medical and health organizations based in Maryland
1888 establishments in the United States
Organizations established in 1888
Non-profit organizations based in the United States
Scientific societies based in the United States